Purse is an English and Scottish surname. Notable people with the surname include:

Daniel Gugel Purse Sr. (1839–1908), American businessman
Darren Purse (born 1977), English footballer
John Purse (born 1972), American cyclist
Charles Sanders Peirce (pronounced "Purse") (1839–1914), American philosopher and scientist